Anna Bettina Christina Pineda Carlos-Eduardo (born December 25, 1987), known professionally as Bettina Carlos, is a Filipino actress and host. She started her career in GMA Network and a contract artist of GMA Network but later moved to rival station ABS-CBN, but during the year 2012 she moved back to her home network GMA 7. She played Izel Guison in Yagit, the main villain. She also played primary villainous roles in Sa Piling ni Nanay and Because of You.

Career
Carlos was only 16 years old when she started appearing in GMA Network shows such as Love to Love and Kakabakaba. That was from 2003 to 2006, and then she tried working with ABS-CBN via being a personality on Studio 23 and then she did the drama series Magkano ang Iyong Dangal? and Wansapanataym. Then she disappeared for a while, and later turned out that she focused on her studies, and earned her degree in Management at the Ateneo University She is currently one of the writers in The Manila Times on the web and composed numerous articles as of now.

Personal life
She has a daughter named Amanda Lucia "Gummy". She married Mikki Eduardo on December 2, 2020.

Filmography

Film

Television

Awards
 Winner, 2004 PMPC Star Awards for Television's "Best Female New TV Personality" for Kakabakaba Adventure.

References

External links

1987 births
Filipino television actresses
Living people
People from Makati
Actresses from Metro Manila
GMA Network personalities
Star Magic
ABS-CBN personalities